Miyapur, located  northwest of Hyderabad, is part of Greater Hyderabad and administered by GHMC and developed by HMDA. Transportation is managed by UMTA.

Miyapur has many lakes, and upscale residential apartments. The Jawaharlal Nehru Technological University is nearby.

Miyapur is one of Hyderabad's busiest places at the head of the Miyapur – L.B. Nagar metro rail corridor. Industrial facilities include IT, pharmaceutical, apparel and industrial development areas. It is strategically located on NH65, the Pune-Hyderabad-Machilipatnam highway. Contributing to the growth are connectivity via the Miyapur-Gachibowli and Miyapur-Kompally intermediate ring roads, and developments like the Hyderabad Metro and ICBT.

History
Miyapur, a Major village, close to Hyderabad, owes much of its ancient history, to the history of Hyderabad. Chalukyas, Kakatiyas, Bahmanis, Qutb Shahis, Mughals and Asaf Jahis ruled this region. It was often referred to as an extension of the Bachupally village.

Miyapur is now a part of Ranga Reddy (RR) district, previously known as 'Hyderabad (Rural)' district, which was formed on 15 August 1978, by carving out and deleting the twin cities of Hyderabad and Secunderabad, a few surrounding urban settlements that formed the urban core, of the erstwhile district of Hyderabad in the erstwhile Indian state of Hyderabad and renamed as Ranga Reddy district after the Late Sri K. V. Ranga Reddy, then deputy chief minister of erstwhile united Andhra Pradesh.

Geography
Miyapur is located at the heart of the Deccan Plateau of the Indian subcontinent in South Asia with  geo coordinates near Kukatpally. Minable minerals include quartz, felspar and limestone. Sand quarrying is also done.

Miyapur falls under the "tropical rainy climatic" group, more specifically a tropical wet and dry or savanna climate.

Miyapur is now part of GHMC, west zone.

Economy
Agriculture was the predominant occupation, before the urbanization of Miyapur. The main crops were cotton, maize, sugar cane, ground nut, red gram etc. In addition Flori-culture, dairy, vegetable cultivation were being practiced by the farmers. Sand quarrying is also an occupation.

For sometime now, Miyapur is turning around, to be a more urban economy with people working in large corporates and moving away from agriculture.

Landmarks 
Lakes
Miyapur Cheruvu
Miyapur Patel Cheruvu
Gangaram Cheruvu
Hafeezpet Cheruvu
Madeenaguda Cheruvu
Ameenpura Lake
Kendriya Vihar
JP Nagar
Vikas, The Concept School
Allwyn Colony Junction
Kalwary Temple
ARK Towers
SMR Vinay City (Narain Estates)
SMR Vinay Hilands
Sriven Mall 
HUDA Mayuri Nagar

Development projects 
Upcoming Projects
HMR
ICBT
Transit Oriented Development (TOD)
Master plan for Hyderabad Metro Rail expansion
Parks
Biodiversity park, Mayuri Nagar, Miyapur.
Fire Stations
Fire Station, HMR Depot-I, Miyapur
Fire Station, ICBT, Miyapur
On-Hold Projects
Elixir City is a  medical city at Ameenpur that is being planned by HMDA, with a focus on medical tourism. As of 2012, this project is on hold.
Hyderabad BRTS – Seems to be a non-starter. Maybe this should be converted to an overhead metro rail.

Miyapur concerns

Issues 
Lakes
Encroachment
Patel Cheruvu Trouble
Pharma-pollution
Fire stations
Cyberabad fire station to be beefed up
Fire stations, firemen and equipment is inadequate
Most buildings in Hyderabad are potential tinder boxes
Environment
Air, water, noise and radiation pollution in Indian cities is a cause of great concern and Miyapur is no exception and the worst part is no one knows which are the culprit industries the polluting industries have been extremely clandestine in their polluting activities.
Miyapur turns into a virtual gas chamber
Trace Element Contamination in Ground Waters of Miyapur and Bollaram, Hyderabad, Telangana, India
Groundwater Quality Assessment of Miyapur Area in Ranga Reddy District, Telangana, India
Andhra Pradesh Pollution Control Board (APPCB) report.
Hyderabad on BARC’s radiation radar
Trees are reducing in great numbers.
Depleting ground water table
Polluting industries
33 pharmaceutical-drug units, some of which include reputed companies like, Dr Reddy's Laboratory, Aurobindo Pharma, which have units in and around Miyapur.
Quality of Roads
Lack of storm water drains
Bottlenecks
Overflowing drains and water logging
Open manholes : Death traps
Sudden troughs, uneven and bumpy road surface : Damage vehicles and causes back pains
Potholes
Shoddy repairs
Traffic congestion
No signboards or even barricades to warn motorists
Land Grabbing
Disputed land survey number 78, Hafeezpet village at Serilingampally mandal.
Govt is reclaiming usurped land in Hyderabad. In Miyapur the disputed land survey numbers are 70, 44, 214.

Remedial measures 
The government, corporates and social workers have been doing a great job by playing an active role in the development of surrounding communities and pollution control.
Erstwhile united Andhra government order to shift polluting industries from Hyderabad
Arun Krishnamurthy, The man who's cleaning up India's dirty lakes
Enforcing Road Sense

Infrastructure

Roads

Inter City Bus Terminal (ICBT), Survey Number 20, Miyapur (upcoming)
Indian National Highways (NH)
NH65, the Pune – Hyderabad – Suryapet – Vijayawada – Machilipatnam highway passes through Miyapur
NH7, the Varanasi-Nagpur-Hyderabad – Bangalore – Kanyakumari highway is connected to NH9 via the intermediate ring road.
Intermediate Ring Roads (IMRR)
IMRR 2 : Miyapur – Gachibowli
IMRR 3 : Miyapur – Kompally
Radial Roads (RR)
RR 9 : Miyapur – Kukatpally road (also known as NH9)
Other Major Roads
Miyapur – Yellamma Banda (near Ambir Cheruvu) road (upcoming).
Miyapur – Hafeezpet road (upcoming, see HMDA masterplan 2031)
Inner Ring Road
Nearest point : East : Punjagutta
PVNR Elevated Expressway
Nearest point : Southeast : Mehdipatnam
Nehru Outer Ring Road
Nearest point : North : Nehru-ORR, Exit 5, Dindigul, Medak
Nearest point : West  : Nehru-ORR, Exit 3, Muthangi, Medak
Nearest point : South : Nehru-ORR, Exit 19, Narsingi
Regional Ring Road
Telangana State Highways (TSSH)

Rail

Hyderabad Metro Rail (HMR) (upcoming)
Miyapur metro station
Miyapur Depot-I
Indian Railways
City Rail – Multi-Modal Transport System (MMTS)
Long Distance Rail –  South Central Railway zone

Air

Airports
Begumpet Airport  is a joint civil and military airport. The biennial Indian Civil Aviation Airshow is held here.

Geo locator

See also

Bachupally
Kukatpally
Nizampet
Transport in Hyderabad
Hyderabad Metro Rail
Hyderabad Multi-Modal Transport System
Education in Hyderabad
C. Earl Stubbs

References

G.Vijay: "Chemicals and Pharmaceuticals in South India: Sun-Rise Industrialisation or Global Cost Shifting of Dirty Goods Manufacturing", in Hans Lofgren and Prakash Sarangi (eds) (2009) The Politics and Culture of Globalisation: India and Australia, Social Science Press, New Delhi.

G.Vijay: 'Other side of Industrialisation', in D’Souza Rohan (ed.,) (2012): Environment, Technology and Development; Critical and Subversive Essays, Orient BlackSwan, Economic and Political Weekly and Tata Institute of Social Sciences; New Delhi.

G.Vijay: 'Systemic Failure of Regulation: The Political Economy of Pharmaceutical and Bulk Drug Manufacturing' in Hans Lofgren (ed) (2013)The politics of the pharmaceutical industry and access to medicines : world pharmacy and India, Social Science Press, New Delhi.

External links

Neighbourhoods in Hyderabad, India
Cities and towns in Hyderabad district, India
Cities and towns in Ranga Reddy district
Villages in Ranga Reddy district
Municipal wards of Hyderabad, India